Mathias Pala (born 14 June 1989) is a French rugby league footballer who currently plays for RC Baho XIII in the Elite Two Championship. He previously played for the Catalans Dragons in the Super League and their feeder club Saint-Esteve XIII Catalan in the Elite One Championship and English club Leigh Centurions.

Background
Pala was born in Carpentras, France and trained in Limoux.

Career
He has previously played in the Super League for the Catalans Dragons and in Australia with the Balmain Tigers.

He represented France in 2011 against England. He is of Italian descent.

He has also played for France in the 2012 Autumn International Series as well as the 2014 European Cup. Pala returned to the international scene in 2016, playing in a one-off test match against England in Avignon.

References

External links
France profile

1989 births
Living people
AS Saint Estève players
Balmain Ryde-Eastwood Tigers players
Catalans Dragons players
France national rugby league team players
French people of Italian descent
French rugby league players
Leigh Leopards players
Limoux Grizzlies players
People from Carpentras
RC Baho XIII players
Rugby league wingers
Sportspeople from Vaucluse